A spiral galaxy is a type of galaxy characterized by a central bulge of old Population II stars surrounded by a rotating disc of younger Population I stars. A spiral galaxy maintains its spirals arms due to density wave theory.


Spiral galaxies

Below is a list of notable spiral galaxies with their own articles. The classification column refers to the galaxy morphological classification used by astronomers to describe galaxy structure.

See also

Lists of astronomical objects
List of galaxies
Spiral galaxy

References

-
Spiral galaxies